Afshin Esmaeil Ghaderzadeh  (born 13 July 2002) is an Iranian Internet personality who is the shortest living man in the World. He was recognized by the Guinness World Records in December 2022. He has dimensions of measuring 65.24 cm (2 ft 1.6 in), which is 7 cm less than the previous person.

Biography 
Ghaderzadeh was born on 13 July 2002 to an Iranian Kurdish family in Bukan, Iran. He stopped studying because of his physical condition, but with the support provided by Iranian National Records Registration Committee, he was able to record the national record of the smallest living man in Iran and then the world record of the smallest living man in the world. One of his friends manages an Instagram page for him. Ghaderzadeh is fluent in Persian and Kurdish.

References

External links 
Recorded by Afshin Esmaeil Ghaderzadeh in Guinness

Living people
Guinness World Records
Iranian people of Kurdish descent
2002 births
People from Bukan